The 1978 Columbia Lions football team was an American football team that represented Columbia University during the 1978 NCAA Division I-A football season. Columbia tied for fifth place in the Ivy League. 

In their fifth season under head coach  William Campbell, the Lions compiled a 3–5–1 record and were outscored 228 to 111. Mike McGraw and Artie Pulsinelli were the team captains.  

The Lions' 2–4–1 conference record placed them in a two-way tie for fifth place in the Ivy League standings. Columbia was outscored 159 to 90 by Ivy opponents. 

Columbia played its home games at Baker Field in Upper Manhattan, in New York City.

Schedule

References

Columbia
Columbia Lions football seasons
Columbia Lions football